Émile Maggi (12 March 1908 – 19 April 1986) was a French racewalker who competed in the 1948 Summer Olympics and in the 1952 Summer Olympics.

References

1908 births
1986 deaths
French male racewalkers
Olympic athletes of France
Athletes (track and field) at the 1948 Summer Olympics
Athletes (track and field) at the 1952 Summer Olympics
European Athletics Championships medalists